Loiyangalani Airport is an airport in Loiyangalani, Kenya.

Location
Loiyangalani Airport is located in Marsabit County, Eastern Province, in the town of Loiyangalani, in the northwestern part of the Republic of Kenya, on the eastern shores of Lake Turkana.

The geographic coordinates of Loiyangalani Airport are:2° 46' 7.00"N, 36° 43' 0.00"E  (Latitude:2.768610; Longitude:36.716667).

Overview
Loiyangalani Airport is a civilian airport that serves the town of Loiyangalani and surrounding communities.

Airlines and destinations
At this time, there is no regular, scheduled airline service to Loiyangalani Airport.

See also
 Kenya Airports Authority
 Kenya Civil Aviation Authority
 List of airports in Kenya

References

External links
 Location of Loiyangalani Airport At Google Maps
  Website of Kenya Airports Authority
 

Airports in Kenya
Eastern Province (Kenya)
Marsabit County